Natalia Kuikka (born 1 December 1995) is a Finnish footballer who plays as a midfielder for Portland Thorns of the American National Women's Soccer League (NWSL) and the Finland National Team.

College career

Florida State University

Kuikka was recruited by Mark Krikorian to join his Florida State University squad for the 2015 season. In her freshman year, she played in a total of 19 games, all as a midfielder, tallying 6 goals and 5 assists. She scored the first goal of her career versus New Mexico State University on 21 August 2015. In the ACC tournament, her goal and two assists earned her the first of her ACC Tournament MVP Awards.

Moving to the central defender role beginning her sophomore season, Kuikka helped solidify a defense that allowed a paltry 0.39 GAA. For the second year in a row, she won the ACC Tournament MVP award for her solid defensive play and two shootout penalty kick conversions.

After being selected as a team captain, success as the director of the defensive line continued in her junior year. The Seminoles had eight clean sheets including two in the NCAA Tournament.

As a senior and team captain, Kuikka anchored the Seminoles defense and led the team to a school-record 16 shutouts, including four in the NCAA Tournament. The final two being in the College Cup versus defending champion Stanford and in the final versus UNC to claim the NCAA Championship. Her efforts garnered her the 2018-9 Honda Sport Award for the top female athlete in NCAA Division I soccer.

Kuikka graduated at the end of Fall Semester 2018 with a bachelor's degree in Criminology.

Club career

Portland Thorns FC
On October 29, 2020, Portland Thorns FC announced that they signed Kuikka to a two-year deal, starting in 2021.

On September 20, 2022, Portland Thorns FC announced that they signed Kuikka to a one-year deal, extending her contract through the 2023 season.

Kopparbergs/Göteborg FC
In January 2019, Kuikka signed with Kopparbergs/Göteborg FC in the Damallsvenskan in Sweden, joining her former Florida State University teammate and Finnish compatriot, Emma Koivisto.

Santa Clarita Blue Heat
In the summer of 2017, Kuikka joined Santa Clarita Blue Heat in the United Women's Soccer league. She helped lead the defense to allow only 5 goals in 8 regular season games.  She started in the UWS semi-final and final alongside Florida State teammate, Deyna Castellanos.

Seattle Sounders Women
In the summer of 2016, Kuikka joined Seattle Sounders Women in the Women's Premier Soccer League.  Alongside Florida State teammates Kaycie Tillman, Megan Connolly, and Cassie Miller, Kuikka helped the team go undefeated in the regular season to become WPSL NW Division Champions.

International career

Senior national team
Kuikka made her debut for the senior Finland National Team for the UEFA Women's Euro 2013.  In 2017, 2020, 2021, and 2022, she earned the Finland National Player of the Year award.

Youth national teams
Having been capped for the Finnish U-16, U-17, U-18, U-19, and U-20 teams, Kuikka also played in the U-20 Women's World Cup in 2014.

Honors

International
 Finland Female National Player of the Year (2022)
 Finland Female National Player of the Year (2021)
 Finland Female National Player of the Year (2020)
 Finland Female National Player of the Year (2017)

Club
Kopparbergs/Goteborg FC
 Svenska Cupen: 2019
 Damallsvenskan Best Back (2020)
 Damallsvenskan: 2020

Portland Thorns FC
 NWSL Community Shield: 2020
 NWSL Challenge Cup: 2021
 International Champions Cup: 2021
 NWSL Championship: 2022

College
 Honda Collegiate Women's Sport Award Winner for Soccer (2018–19)
 NCAA Division I Women's Soccer Championship (2018) 
 College Cup All-Tournament Team (2018)
 United Soccer Coaches All-American Third Team (2018)
 United Soccer Coaches All-Atlantic Region First Team (2018)
 All-ACC Second Team (2018)
 ACC All-Tournament Team (2018)
 ACC Defensive Player of the Week (October 23, 2018)
 MAC Hermann Trophy Watch List (2018)
 Team Captain (2018)
 United Soccer Coaches All-East Region Second Team (2017)
 All-ACC First Team (2017)
 MAC Hermann Trophy Watch List (2017)
 Team Captain (2017)
 NSCAA All-American Third Team (2016)
 NSCAA All-Southeast Region First Team (2016)
 All-ACC Second Team (2016)
 ACC Tournament MVP (2016)
 ACC All-Tournament Team (2016)
 ACC All-Freshman Team (2015)
 ACC Tournament MVP (2015)
 ACC All-Tournament Team (2015)
 TopDrawerSoccer Freshman Best XI Second Team (2015)
 TopDrawerSoccer Team of the Week (11/10/15, 11/24/15)

Personal life
Kuikka's hometown is Kemi, Finland.  She is the daughter of Heli Kuikka and Hannu Suhonen.

References

External links

Profile at goteborgfc.se 

Profile at fussballtransfers.com 

Profile at soccerdonna.de 
Profile at Football Association of Finland 
FSU Bio

1995 births
Living people
Finnish women's footballers
Finland women's international footballers
Kansallinen Liiga players
Kokkola Futis 10 players
Merilappi United players
Expatriate women's soccer players in the United States
Florida State Seminoles women's soccer players
Finnish expatriate footballers
Finnish expatriate sportspeople in the United States
Women's association football midfielders
BK Häcken FF players
Damallsvenskan players
Portland Thorns FC players
Finnish expatriate sportspeople in Sweden
Expatriate women's footballers in Sweden
National Women's Soccer League players
People from Kemi
Sportspeople from Lapland (Finland)
UEFA Women's Euro 2022 players